EdLab was an education research organization located at Columbia University's Teachers College in New York City. The EdLab was established to create effective and efficient methods of education and education research through communication and advancements in technology, and served as both a university and community resource center. The mission of EdLab is to engage in conceptual development, demonstration projects, and new educational research to explore and document diverse possibilities for the future of education.Founded in 2004, it started under the leadership of Professor Gary Natriello, Edlab was a unit of the Gottesman Libraries at Teachers College. EdLab housed both library administration and an interdisciplinary team of developers, designers and content creators. Their work was divided into five foundational areas: Reimagining Schooling, Innovations for Online Learning, New Directions for Online Publishing, Efficiencies in Educational Research, and Charting the Future of Libraries. EdLab was organized in small flexible multi-disciplinary teams that collaborate to develop and deliver products and services of distinction.

Projects

EdLab Seminar (2005 - 2019) 
EdLab hosted seminars at the Gottesman Libraries at Teachers College (almost) every Wednesday.

Vialogues (2011 - 2019) 
Vialogues was a free, online video discussion platform. It was created and developed by a dedicated team of educators, researchers, and engineers from EdLab at Teachers College Columbia University. As well as uploading original content, vialogues also allows users to "borrow" content from YouTube & Vimeo in order to create a discussions. Vialogues also allows users to embed video discussion on other websites, and allows videos to be private or public, as well as include interactive features like polls. Research has shown that the use of cognitive words within vialogues discussions contributes positively to user engagement, in addition to the number of views, the number of moderator comments, and the number of time-code clicks, which also correlate positively with user engagement.

New Learning Times (2013 - 2019)
The New Learning Times (NLT) was an online publication created and hosted by EdLab, centered on developing innovations in the education sector. It publishes articles daily, and aims to provide "coverage of the transformation of learning opportunities in the information age for those shaping the future of education". NLT publishes a number of regular features including:
 EdLab Review
 NL Sector
 Research Digest
 Seen in NY
 VisualizED

Between January and March 2019, NLT had 18,770 user visits.

Seen in NY
Seen in NY was a weekly web series produced by EdLab Studios and published as part of the New Learning Times project platform. As a video series, Seen in NY focused on current educational opportunities in New York. The videos were designed as a resource for the education community, and as stand-alone pieces which represented the work of the featured organization or event. They were part of the new learning sector, where the experience of making the videos are part of the pedagogic experience, as video dialogues.

Seen in NY featured a wide array of educational opportunities, experiences and events, from hundreds of different organizations in New York City, and across the entire state. There are approximately 250 episodes spanning multiple demographics and featuring a diverse range of subject matter, from STEM, to arts, and social justice, that are available on the EdLab blog, on EdLab's Vialogues interface, and as embedded content on the subject of the videos' organization websites.

Series overview

Rhizr (2015 - 2019) 
Rhizr was an online learning tool which brings together learners of similar interests and provides a space to share thoughts, work together, and build off of ideas. Users are able to create, remix and share educational resources amongst each other. Rhizr was created in 2017 by a team of researchers, developers, and content creators at the Gottesman Libraries of Teachers College Columbia University. The mSchool initiative paved the way for what is now known as Rhizr. The name is a metaphor based on a Rhizome, which is a structure of roots and nodes organized in a random and non-hierarchically structure. "Rhizomatic learning" is based on ideas from Gilles Deleuze. Rhizr utilizes modules so that users can share, organize and save information in a non-linear way with a format that is similar to Trello. In June 2019 a new version of Rhizr was released by EdLab with greater flexibility and faster search.

Teachers College Record 
From 2004 - 2019, EdLab was the publisher of the Teachers College Record, a journal of research, analysis, and commentary in the field of education which has been published continuously since 1900 by Teachers College.

Research 
Postdoctoral research scientists at Edlab drew on their prior professional experience to invent, manage, and assess a range of new functions and services as part of the overall research program designed to create a rich environment for self-directed and social learning in the library and beyond.

References

External links
 EdLab website
 Projects at EdLab
 Vialogues - Video Discussion Platform
 PocketKnowledge - Teachers College Archive

Columbia University
Upper West Side